Terrenoire or Terrenoir is a surname of French origin.

List of people with the surname 

 Alain Terrenoire (born 1941), French lawyer and politician
 Anne Stambach-Terrenoir (born 1980), French politician
 Louis Terrenoire, French politician

See also 

 Terre Noire, Nova Scotia
 Terret noir

Surnames
Surnames of French origin
French-language surnames